The SCOFF questionnaire utilizes an acronym in a simple five question test devised for use by non-professionals to assess the possible presence of an eating disorder. It was devised by Morgan et al. in 1999. The original SCOFF questionnaire was devised for use in the United Kingdom, thus the original acronym needs to be adjusted for users in the United States and Canada. The "S" in SCOFF stands for "Sick" which in British English means specifically to vomit. In American English and Canadian English it is synonymous with "ill". The "O" is used in the acronym to denote "one stone". A "stone" is an Imperial unit of weight which made up of 14 lbs (equivalent to 6.35 kg). The letters in the full acronym are taken from key words in the questions:
Sick
Control
One stone (14 lbs/6.5 kg)
Fat
Food

Scoring
One point is assigned for every "yes"; a score greater than two (≥2) indicates a possible case of anorexia nervosa or bulimia nervosa.

See also
 Body Attitudes Questionnaire
 Body Attitudes Test
 Eating Attitudes Test
 Eating Disorder Examination Interview
 Eating Disorder Inventory
 Minnesota Eating Behavior Survey

References

External links
 Adapted questionnaire online

Eating disorders screening and assessment tools